This is a list of electoral results for the Electoral district of Melville in Western Australian state elections.

Members for Melville

Election results

Elections in the 1980s

Elections in the 1970s

Elections in the 1960s

Elections in the 1950s 

 Preferences were not distributed.

References

Western Australian state electoral results by district